The NAG Numerical Library is a software product developed and sold by The Numerical Algorithms Group Ltd. It is a software library of numerical analysis routines, containing more than 1,900 mathematical and statistical algorithms.  Areas covered by the library include linear algebra, optimization, quadrature, the solution of ordinary and partial differential equations, regression analysis, and time series analysis.

Users of the NAG Library call its routines from within their applications in order to incorporate its mathematical or statistical functionality and to solve numerical problems - for example, finding the minimum or maximum of a function, fitting a curve or surface to data, or solving a differential equation.  The Library is available in the many forms, but namely the NAG C Library, the NAG Fortran Library, and the NAG Library for .NET. Its contents are accessible from several computing environments, including standard languages such as C, C++, Fortran, Visual Basic, Java, Python and C#, as well as packages such as MATLAB, R, LabVIEW, Excel, Origin and Ch. 
Supported operating systems include the 32 bit and 64 bit versions of Windows,  Linux and macOS, as well as Solaris, AIX and HP-UX.

History 
The original version of the NAG Library was written in Algol 60 and Fortran.  It contained 98 user-callable routines, and was released for the ICL 1906A and 1906S machines on October 1, 1971.  Three further Marks of the library appeared in the following five years; during this time the Algol version was ported to Algol 68, with the following platforms being supported: CDC 7600/CYBER (CDC ALGOL 68), IBM 360/370/AMDAHL (FLACC ALGOL 68), ICL 1900 (ALGOL 68R), ICL 1906A/S (ALGOL 68R), ICL 2900 (ALGOL 68RS) and Telefunken TR440 (ALGOL 68C).

The first partially vectorized implementation of the NAG Fortran Library for the Cray-1 was released in 1983, while the first release of the NAG Parallel Library (which is specially designed for distributed memory parallel computer architectures) was in the early 1990s.  Mark 1 of the NAG C Library was released in 1990.  In 1992, the Library incorporated LAPACK routines for the first time; NAG had been a collaborator in the LAPACK project since 1987.  The first release of the NAG Library for SMP & multicore, which takes advantage of the shared memory parallelism of Symmetric Multi-Processors (SMP) and multicore processors, appeared in 1997 for multiprocessor machines built using the Dec Alpha and SPARC architectures. The NAG Library for .NET, which is a CLI DLL assembly containing methods and objects that give Common Language Infrastructure (CLI) users access to NAG algorithms, was first released in 2010.

Current version 
Mark 27 of the NAG Library houses over 1,900 mathematical and statistical algorithms organised into chapters.

See also 
List of numerical-analysis software
List of numerical libraries

References

External links 
NAG Numerical Libraries

History of computing in the United Kingdom
Numerical libraries
Science and technology in Oxfordshire